Gariūnai Market is the biggest market in Lithuania, located in  microdistrict (Lithuanian: miesto dalis) of Vilnius, the capital of Lithuania. 

There are about 10,000 sellers working.

In the end of 2010, an expansion for the market was built.

See also 
 List of shopping malls in Lithuania

External links

References

Retail markets in Lithuania
Economy of Vilnius
Buildings and structures in Vilnius